Carrollton is the name of some places in the United States of America:
Carrollton, Alabama
Carrollton, Arkansas
Carrollton, Georgia
Carrollton, Illinois
Carrollton, Carroll County, Indiana
Carrollton, Hancock County, Indiana
Carrollton, Kentucky
Carrollton, Maryland, a former town now in the city of Baltimore
Carrollton Manor, a tract of land in Frederick County, Maryland, from which a signer of the U.S. Declaration of Independence, Charles Carroll of Carrollton, took his name
Carrollton, Mississippi
Carrollton, Missouri
Carrollton, New Orleans, a former town now in the city New Orleans, Louisiana
Carrollton, New York
Carrollton, Ohio
Carrollton, Texas, the largest city of this name in the United States
Carrollton, Virginia
New Carrollton, Maryland

Other

Carrollton, Kentucky bus collision
Carrollton School of the Sacred Heart, an independent Catholic girls' school in Miami, Florida
Carrollton (band)
"Carrollton", a song by Suicideboys from I Want to Die in New Orleans
Carrollton (name)

See also
Carroll (disambiguation), various places
Carrolltown, Pennsylvania
Carrollton Historic District (disambiguation)
Carrollton Township (disambiguation)
Carrolton Township, Fillmore County, Minnesota